The Saint Paul's Vestry House is a historic building in Lynchburg, Virginia, United States.  It was built about 1855 and is a single-story Classical Revival-style building with a simple low pitched gable roof and a rectangular plan.  It is likely the only vestry house built exclusively for the governing body of an Episcopal Church in Virginia.  It also served as the first home of the Lynchburg Woman's Club from 1903 to 1916.

It was listed on the National Register of Historic Places in 1997.

References

19th-century Episcopal church buildings
Buildings and structures in Lynchburg, Virginia
Churches completed in 1855
Episcopal churches in Virginia
National Register of Historic Places in Lynchburg, Virginia
Neoclassical architecture in Virginia
Churches on the National Register of Historic Places in Virginia